Elizabeth Coates, sometimes known as Liz Coates, is a British ice dancing coach and former competitor. With Alan Abretti, she is the 1986 Fujifilm Trophy silver medalist and a two-time British national silver medalist.

Life and career 
Coates grew up in south London, with her brother Gary, and trained at the ice rink in Streatham. Competing with Alan Abretti, she won silver medals at the 1985 and 1986 British Championships and at the 1986 Fujifilm Trophy. The duo placed 16th at the 1986 World Championships and competed at two European Championships, achieving their highest placement, 11th, in 1986.

Having begun her coaching career in England, Coates relocated to the United States in 1992. With former coaching partner Igor Shpilband, she was awarded the 1998 United States Olympic Committee "Coach of the Year" for Figure Skating. In 2000, Coates was awarded the "Coach of the Year" by the Professional Skaters Association (PSA) She has returned to England and currently works as a coach in London.

Her former students include:
 Tanith Belbin / Benjamin Agosto
 Eve Chalom / Mathew Gates
 Jessica Joseph / Charles Butler
 Naomi Lang / Peter Tchernyshev 
 Elizabeth Punsalan / Jerod Swallow
 Jamie Silverstein / Justin Pekarek
 Megan Wing / Aaron Lowe

Competitive highlights 
(with Abretti)

References

British female ice dancers
British figure skating coaches
Living people
Female sports coaches
Year of birth missing (living people)